The American Cat Fanciers Association (ACFA) is an American non-profit organization formed with the intent of allowing greater flexibility in the development of pedigreed cats. The ACFA is a cat registry for purebred, pedigreed cats, experimental breeds of cats, and household pet cats.

ACFA sanctioned cat shows include classes for championship adult cats, championship altered cats, registered kittens from the age of four to eight months, and household pet cats. Wins from licensed shows can be used to claim titles including championships and multiple championships, grand championships and multiple grand championships, and the household pet titles of Royal Household Pet and Supreme Household Pet.

ACFA is directly affiliated with the Cat Aficionado Association of China, who use the ACFA breed standards.

History
ACFA was founded in 1955 in the Dallas and Fort Worth area. It was created by a group of cat fanciers desiring to show their cats in a democratic association, that is, one where individual members had voting rights on election of officers, acceptance of new show rules, by-laws and breed standards and acceptance of new breeds of cats.

As of 2009, the AFCA officially recognized 68 different cat breeds, together with The International Cat Association. By 2018. the AFCA (by itself) recognized 41 distinct pedigree breeds.

See also
List of cat breeds
List of cat registries

Notes

References
 allaboutdogsandcats.com

External links
 

Cat registries
Clubs and societies in the United States
1955 establishments in the United States